The P&M GT450 is a British two-seat flexwing ultralight trike built by P&M Aviation of Manton, Marlborough, Wiltshire.

Development
The GT450 is derived from the Pegasus Quik, a design produced by Pegasus Aviation, prior to its merger with Mainair Sports in 2003.

The aircraft is equipped with a flexible wing with Trilam leading edge and a Kevlar trailing edge. The aircraft is equipped with a  Rotax 912UL or optionally a  Rotax 912ULS, both with electric starters, and a  polyethylene fuel tank mounted under the seat. Dual hydraulic rear-wheel disc brakes with a parking brake feature are standard. The cockpit fairing is made of fibreglass.

Specifications (GT450)

References

External links

P&M GT450
2000s British ultralight aircraft
Ultralight trikes